Pedrito Martinez is a Cuban percussionist, drummer, singer, dancer, bandleader, songwriter, composer, and educator. He was born and raised in Havana, Cuba.  He is a Cuban Conguero performing classic Cuban Rumbas, Afro-Cuban folkloric and religious music. He is a Santería priest.   He came to the United States of America from Havana in 1998. He plays the Batá drum, conga, cajón, timbale, and bongo drums, among other percussion instruments. Pedrito learned his craft from the streets of Havana, Cuba. He has performed with Paquito D'Rivera, Arturo O'Farrill, Brian Lynch, and Bruce Springsteen. He settled in the New York City - New Jersey area in 1998.

He is a founding member of the band Yerba Buena. They recorded two albums. In 2003, President Alien, and in 2005 their album Island Life was No. 62 on the Billboard Top Latin Albums Chart. 
 
He is a member of the Nuevo Jazz Latino program which is a part of  Jazz at Lincoln Center.

Martinez became leader of the Pedrito Martinez Group in 2005.  Their first album The Pedrito Martinez Group was released in 2013, with guest artists Wynton Marsalis, John Scofield, and Steve Gadd.

On Martinez's 2016 album titled Habana Dreams, the guest artists were Wynton Marsalis, Ruben Blades, Angélique Kidjo, and Issac Delgado.

Early life
Pedro Pablo "Pedrito" Martinez was born in Havana, Cuba, September 12, 1973 in the Cayo Hueso neighborhood of Old Havana. Cayo Hueso is a neighborhood known for African-derived rumba rhythms. He grew up near the Palacio de la Rumba theater and watched renowned artists rehearse and perform as a child.  The house he grew up in was across the street from a park where he became fascinated by men playing percussion, singing and dancing Cuban rumba, a foundational folkloric music and dance with deep roots in Africa.  He began his musical career at the age of eleven performing with Cuban artist Tata Guines, and Los Muñequitos de Matanzas as a teenager. 
Pedrito steeped himself in this style, eventually achieving the status of "rumbero". He was then introduced to Yoruba, also known as Santeria, another Afro-Cuban folkloric tradition of great significance, a religion of West African origin which has its own powerful style of music involving ceremonial drums called Bata.  Martinez mastered the extremely complex rhythms played on the batas as well as the litany of Orisha chants associated with the religion, which eventually led to him assuming the role and status of "babalawo", or Santeria priest.
In 1996, Canadian bandleader Jane Bunnett, while visiting Cuba, had occasion to see Pedrito play and returned two years later to bring him to play in Montreal with her band Spirit of Havana.

Career
By the fall of 1998, Martinez had settled in New York City and very shortly thereafter, won first prize in the prestigious Thelonious Monk Competition for Afro Latin Hand Percussion, presented at the Kennedy Center in Washington, DC.  In 2000, he was featured in the important documentary film on Cuban music, "Calle 54".   He has performed with Wynton Marsalis, Paquito D'Rivera, Bruce Springsteen, Paul Simon, James Taylor, Sting, Steve Turre, Bill Summers, Cassandra Wilson, Joe Lovano, Brian Lynch (musician), Stefon Harris, Jane Bunnett,  Issac Delgado, Eliane Elias, Stefon Harris,  Angélique Kidjo,  Gonzalo Rubalcaba, Conrad Herwig , Edie Brickell, Rubén Blades, Eddie Palmieri,  Esperanza Spalding,  Alfredo Rodríguez (pianist born 1985), Elton John, and Los Hombres Calientes and has contributed to well over 50 albums.

Pedrito Martinez was a founding member of the highly successful Afro-Cuban/Afro-Beat band Yerba Buena, which was formed in 2004, and with which he recorded two albums and toured the world. His career as a bandleader, of the Pedrito Martinez Group, began in 2005 in NYC with a four-night a week residency at Guantanamera, a restaurant in midtown Manhattan, where, once word spread, began attracting musicians like Eric Clapton, Paul Simon, Steve Winwood, Taj Mahal, and Roger Waters.
The Pedrito Martinez Group, the first album recorded by Pedrito as a leader, was released October 2013 on Motema Music. The album was nominated for a Grammy for Best Latin Jazz Album and was chosen among NPR's  Favorite Albums of 2013 and the Boston Globe Critics "Top Ten Albums of 2013". Wynton Marsalis, John Scofield, and Steve Gadd appeared as special guests.
Around the same time, an album of flamenco music, Rumba de la Isla was recorded with a different set of musicians, distributed by Sony Masterworks.
Habana Dreams, the second album by the Pedrito Martinez Group, was recorded largely in Cuba and was released June 10, 2016 on Motema Music.  Guests include Ruben Blades, Issac Delgado, Wynton Marsalis, and Angelique Kidjo.
In February 2019, Pedrito Martinez and Cuban pianist, Alfredo Rodriguez released a duo album called Duologue which was selected by NPR for a First Listen: https://www.npr.org/2019/01/24/687794667/first-listen-alfredo-rodr-guez-pedrito-martinez-duologue .

In February 2019, NPR released a performance of the Pedrito Martinez Group that was filmed in January for the Tiny Desk Series. https://www.npr.org/2019/02/14/694731448/the-pedrito-martinez-group-tiny-desk-concert . In February 2021 Martinez announced that he would be releasing a new album entitled 'Acertijos' (Riddles) on March 19 with special guests including Eric Clapton, Jon Faddis, Gilberto Santa Rosa, Isaac Delgado, and more through his label Eshuni Records and Immediate Family Records.

Credits

Festivals
2018 - BRIC JazzFest in Brooklyn, New York
2017 - Jazz Fest, New Orleans, Louisiana
2017 - Spoleto Festival, Charleston, South Carolina
2014-15 - Jazz at Lincoln Center season world premiere of Ochas for a big band with Afro-Cuban percussionist Pedrito Martinez with the Jazz at Lincoln Center Orchestra.
2012 - Newport Jazz Festival in Newport, Rhode Island.

Awards and nominations
 2000 - Thelonious Monk Jazz Competition - Pedrito Martinez - Afro-Latin Hand Drumming Award         - 1st place
 2004 	Grammy Awards 	President Alien (Yerba Buena) 	    - Best Latin Rock, Urban or Alt Album[3]  - Nominated
 2014 	Grammy Awards 	La Noche Más Larga (Concha Buika)   - Best Latin Jazz Album[19] 	      - Nominated
 2016 - Boston Globe's World Music Albums
 2016 - #1 Latin Jazz Album - NPR Critics Top Jazz Album

References

External links
Wynton Marsalis & Pedrito Martinez present "Ochas"
The Pedrito Martinez Group - "Compa Gellatano" (PASIC 2016)
Pedrito Martinez Conga Solo
James Ross @ (Percussion Clinic) with Pedrito Martinez & Weedie Braimah - www.Jross-tv.com

1973 births
Living people
Afro-Cuban jazz drummers
Cuban male singers
Afro-Cuban jazz percussionists
Latin jazz drummers
American jazz drummers
Mambo musicians
American male drummers
Latin music composers
American male jazz musicians
Cuban musicians
Conga players
Cuban percussionists
Latin jazz percussionists
Cuban emigrants to the United States
Babalawos
American Santeríans
Cuban Santeríans
Mack Avenue Records artists
Motéma Music artists